Archbishopric of Belgrade and Karlovci is the central or patriarchal eparchy of the Serbian Orthodox Church, with seat in Belgrade, Serbia. The head of the eparchy is the Serbian patriarch.

History

History of the eparchy, since 1920

In 1920, after the unification of all Serbian ecclesiastical provinces into one united Serbian Orthodox Church, old Eparchy of Syrmia with its seat in Sremski Karlovci came under direct administration of the archbishop of Belgrade who was also the Serbian patriarch. Formal unification of two eparchies was completed in 1931 when Archbishopric of Belgrade was joined with the Eparchy of Syrmia into the Archbishopric of Belgrade and Karlovci. In that time, the city of Pančevo was transferred from Eparchy of Vršac to the Archeparchy of Belgrade and Karlovci. In 1947, Eparchy of Syrmia and Eparchy of Šumadija were excluded from the Archbishopric of Belgrade and Karlovci and were transformed into separate organizational units. The city of Pančevo was returned to the Eparchy of Banat. Although, the name of the Archbishopric of Belgrade and Karlovci includes the name of the town of Karlovci (Sremski Karlovci), this town is today part of the Eparchy of Syrmia and not of the Archbishopric of Belgrade and Karlovci.

Historical background, before 1920

Eparchy of Belgrade is one of the oldest ecclesiastical institutions in this part of Europe. Ancient Bishopric of Singidunum was an important ecclesiastical center of the late Roman Empire during 4th and 5th century. Its bishops Ursacius and Secundianus were actively involved in religious controversies over Arianism. That ancient bishopric finally collapsed after 584 when ancient Singidunum was finally destroyed by Avars. 

After the Christianization of Slavs, eparchy was renewed as late as 9th century. First medieval Bishop of Belgrade who is known by name was Sergije in 878. Since 1018 it belonged to the Eastern Orthodox Archbishopric of Ohrid. At the end of the 13th century, Belgrade became the capital city of Serbian king Stefan Dragutin and Eparchy of Belgrad came under jurisdiction of Serbian Orthodox Church. At the beginning of the 15th century, during the rule of Serbian despot Stefan Lazarević, metropolitans of Belgrade were among most influential hierarchs of the Serbian Patriarchate of Peć. Belgrade fell under Turkish rule in 1521, but Serbian Patriarchate was renewed in 1557 with its seat in the Patriarchal Monastery of Peć. During 16th and 17th centuries, Serbian bishops of Belgrade were styled as "Metropolitans of Belgrade and Srem". 

At the end of the 17th century, regions of Belgrade and Srem were separated by the outcome of the Austro-Turkish War (1683–1699), with Belgrade and Lower Srem remaining under Ottoman rule, while Upper Srem came under Habsburg rule. In 1708, when the autonomous Serbian Metropolitanate in the Habsburg monarchy was created (Metropolitanate of Karlovci), the Eparchy of Srem became archdiocese of the Metropolitan, whose seat was in Sremski Karlovci. As a result of the Austro-Turkish War (1716–1718), Lower Srem and Belgrade came under Habsburg rule. Two seats (Belgrade and Karlovci) were reunited from 1726 to 1739, and then separated again, following the outcome of the Austro-Turkish War (1737–1739). 

Aftef that, Eparchy of Srem remained part of Metropolitanate of Karlovci until 1920, while the Eparchy of Belgrade was returned to jurisdiction of Serbian Patriarchs of Peć. After the abolition of the Serbian Patriarchate of Peć in 1766, Eparchy of Belgrade came under jurisdiction of the Patriarchate of Constantinople.  

In 1831, Eastern Orthodox Church in Principality of Serbia gained its autonomy from the Ecumenical Patriarchate of Constantinople, and Belgrade became the seat of the archbishop who was now metropolitan of Serbia. In that time, territory of the archeparchy was very large and included regions of present-day eparchies of Šumadija and Braničevo. The Metropolitanate gained autocephaly in 1879.

In 1920, the Metropolitanate of Belgrade merged with other Serbian ecclesiastical provinces to form united Serbian Orthodox Church. In the same year, region of Braničevo was separated from the archeparchy and old Eparchy of Braničevo was restored. In 1947, region of Šumadija was also separated from the archeparchy and new Eparchy of Šumadija was created. Since then, the archbishopric was reduced to the inner limits of the City of Belgrade.

Monasteries
There are 12 monasteries within the Archbishopric.

Heads
During the long history of the ecclesiastical seat of Belgrade, many bishops, metropolitans, archbishops and finally patriarchs were seated on the throne of this eparchy.

Bishops and metropolitans of Belgrade (until 1766)

Under direct jurisdiction of Constantinople (1766–1831)

Autonomous (1831–1879) and autocephalous (1879–1920)

Metropolitans of Belgrade and Karlovci (1920–present)

See also
Serbian Orthodox Church
List of eparchies of the Serbian Orthodox Church
Religion in Serbia
Eastern Orthodoxy in Serbia

References

Literature 

 
 
 
 
 
 
 
 
 
 
 
 
 
 
 
 
 
 
 
 
 
 
 
 
 
 
 

Serbian Orthodox Church in Serbia
1931 establishments in Serbia
Christian organizations established in 1931
Christianity in Belgrade
Sremski Karlovci
Religious sees of the Serbian Orthodox Church